The 1998–99 Ottawa Senators season was the seventh season of the Ottawa Senators of the National Hockey League (NHL). In this season the team cracked the 100 point barrier, as they finished with 103 points, and won the Northeast Division for the first time in club history.

Senators Head Coach Jacques Martin won the Jack Adams Trophy for the first time in his career and in Senators history, while Alexei Yashin, who was named team captain prior to the season, was a finalist for the Hart Memorial Trophy after his 94-point season. His 94 points obliterated the club record of 79, which Yashin himself set in the 1993–94 season.

Goaltenders Damian Rhodes and Ron Tugnutt split duties throughout the season, with each winning 22 games, sharing the team record for goaltender victories in a season, while Tugnutt's 1.79 goals against average (GAA) was an NHL low.

The Senators great regular season success did not continue to the playoffs, as the Buffalo Sabres, led by Dominik Hasek, swept the Senators out of the playoffs in four games, ending the Senators' season in the first round for the second time in three seasons.

Regular season

Final standings

Schedule and results

Playoffs

The Ottawa Senators ended the 1998–99 regular season as the Eastern Conference's second seed.

Eastern Conference Quarterfinals: vs. (7) Buffalo Sabres
Buffalo wins series 4–0

Player statistics

Regular season
Scoring

Goaltending

Playoffs
Scoring

Goaltending

Awards and records
 Jack Adams Award – Jacques Martin
 Molson Cup – Alexei Yashin
 NHL second All-Star team – Alexei Yashin

Transactions

Trades

Waivers
No waiver transactions.

Free agents

Expansion draft

Source:

Draft picks
Ottawa's draft picks at the 1998 NHL Entry Draft in Buffalo, New York.

Farm teams
 Detroit Vipers (International Hockey League)

See also
1998–99 NHL season

References

Bibliography
 
Ottawa Senators Media Guide 2007
The Internet Hockey Database
National Hockey League Guide & Record Book 2007

Ottawa Senators seasons
Ottawa Senators season, 1998-99
Ottawa